Balakot is a town in Mansehra District in the Khyber Pakhtunkhwa province of Pakistan. The town was destroyed during the 2005 Kashmir region earthquake 
but was later rebuilt with the assistance of the Government of Pakistan and Saudi Public Assistance for Pakistan Earthquake Victims (SPAPEV), a Saudi relief organisation. Balakot also serves as a hub for tourists visiting Northern Areas

Geography

Balakot is located on the right bank of the Kunhar River. It is almost at two-thirds of the length of river from it its origin at Lake Dharam Sar deep in the Kaghan Valley, before it confluence with Jehlum River.

The lower area below Balakot, sometimes referred to as Nainsukh Valley, is temperate while Kaghan Valley above Balakot City is cold enough to turn the whole area to freezing in the winter. Kaghan valley is a pleasant summer destination. Its upper part from Naran upstream lacks the monsoon but the lower part get it well and so is forested.

Balakot is now expanding city and centre among distant northern parts of Pakistan.  Smaller hamlets are located in the terraced mountains around it.

Climate
Balakot has a humid subtropical climate (Köppen climate classification Cfa) with hot summers and cool winters. Rainfall in Balakot is much higher than in most other parts of Pakistan. The heaviest rainfall occurs either in late winter (February–March) associated with frontal systems, or in the monsoon season (June–August); however, all months see significant rainfall on average.

Administration 
Balakot is one of the main cities of Mansehra District. It serves as the chief city of Balakot Tehsil, which is the largest Tehsil of Mansehra District. It has also a Union Council and administers the many surrounding smaller towns and villages.

History

Early history 
The known history of the city is not well recorded before the British Period. Archaeologists from Hazara University, however, have found terracotta remains and terracotta figurines from distant points in the high altitudes around the area. They might shed light on earlier inhabitants of the area.

Old graveyards also suggest the linkages toward pre-Muslim occupants who later converted to Islam.

Mughal Empire 

Mughals ultimately had this place under their control and there is a local tradition of Mughal Queen, Nur Jahan, while on the way to Kashmir, used the route below Balakot near Garhi Habibullah Khan.

Sikhs 
Battle of Balakot is the defining battle in which Syed Ahmad and Shah Ismail were killed. The historical records give a detailed account of the Tehreek-ul-Mujahideen from Raebareli under the Syed Ahmad Barelvi and Shah Ismail. They were accompanied by many followers who believe Syed Ahmad to be a Khalifah, i.e. Caliph, from Raebareli and some local followers of Swati and Syed clans. Balakot was a refuge to them after being ousted from Swabi and Amb State. The Sikhs, under the banner of Lahore Durbar fought the defining battle against this movement and killed every one in general. However, there are local tradition of revering different sites in the hills, by making small stone enclosure where the blood of the wounded Mujahideen was supposedly spilled. They name it as, 'Shaheed'. For the sake of this event, Balakot City is sometime also referred to as, Shuhada ki Sarzameen, i.e. The Land of Martyrs. Sikh Army tried to penetrate from the Garhi Habibullah (15 km downstream) with armies from Kashmir but were put to hold till the reinforcement arrived from Lahore via Timri near Shinkiari. On a little mound in the north of the city, by the Rou Nala, the Battle of Balakot was fought on 6 May 1831. Sikhs became victorious and all the Mujahideens including Syed Ahmad and Shah Ismail were killed.

Mahtab Singh, a writer of the history of Hazara to the wish of James Abbot, writes that Sikhs, to stop the movement to continue any further, reopened the grave of Syed Ahmad and set the body into the Kunhar River. It may possibly be right as in Talhatta 10 km down stream another grave is also dedicated to him. Local tradition also support that it is the head buried here.

It was a brutal and fearsome rule which ended after James Abbot's coming in Hazara and things changed after he incited local chiefdom against Sikhs in his own bid. There have been many skirmishes between locals and Shiks forces. One famous event happened in 1844 when Gulab Singh, Maharaja of Kashmir sent a campaign to Chilas under Diwan Ibrahim, which was effectively destroyed by local populations in Kaghan Valley at Diwan Bela, named after him.

British Rule 
After James Abbot coming to the region in early 1840s, Sikhs were kept in check in upper Hazara. And he was able to wage war on Sikhs with this local support in Haripur. It was brutal rule of Sikhs which made him lead local chiefs and their forces. He sat in Balakot and distributed the land to the people in a summary settlement.

During the War of Independence 1857, no local chief is reported to have revolted. It is rather the other side of the history that local chiefs helped British Army to bring down mutineers of Hoti Garrission, Mardan. 55th Native Infantry mutineers were trying to seek refuge in Kashmir State, however they were only able to cross Indus in Kohistan and went up the hilly route and caught near Lake Dudipatsar by local forces of the Kaghan chiefs, Kohistanis and Gujjars. The whole gorge is now known as Purbi Nar means the gorge of Eastern People i.e. people from Bengal. Few escaped and captured by Kashmir State and then handed over to British Army for execution.

Rest of the British Period gone well and many remains of British Period structures can be seen. Examples are Dakbungalows at Burawai (now ruined PWD Rest House), Lalazar, Battakundi, Naran (now WAPDA Rest House), Kamal Ban, Sharan, Shogran, Balakot can be seen. There are number of bridges also found.

Independence 1947 
Oral tradition says that there were many Hindu and Sikh inhabitants, most of whom were Khatris who decided to leave for India after partition. No reports of any riots emerged from the time. However, the parties were launched to put the Kashmir State Army on hold along current Line of Control from all the villages around Balakot.

2005 earthquake

The town was completely destroyed in a destructive earthquake on 8 October 2005. The fault almost passes through the main bazaar of Balakot. It follows the hilly area to the north up to Allai and leads to the Bagh in Azad Jammu & Kashmir from the villages of Balakot like Kanshian and Jabri Kaleesh. This fault line – the Balakot-Bagh fault – is said to be the source of the Kashmir earthquake. The estimated death toll from the Balakot town and the districts in the affected Kashmir area was put at 73,000 with some sources claiming the number is over 80,000. The hillside town of Balakot, comprising 12 union councils with a population of 30,000 people, was completely destroyed by the earthquake on 8 October 2005. Over 90 per cent of the houses were reduced to muddy smears. The survivors will be relocated to the New Balakot City, currently being developed near Mansehra.

The United Arab Emirates volunteered to rebuild this town into an improved one with housing colonies, schools, hospitals, and other civic facilities. However the Pakistan government has announced that the city will be relocated about 20 km away at a safer spot with more earthquake-proof buildings (see section below).

Jaish-e-Mohammed militant group also had presence near the town. A 2004 United States Department of Defense document also stated that there was a JeM training camp in Balakot. However, according to analysts, the militants left Balakot after the earthquake in 2005 to avoid detection by the international aid groups arriving to provide relief.

New Balakot City
After the earthquake, it was discovered that the city was built on geological fault lines and the government recommended moving the residents 15 miles away to Bakarial. Many residents, however, were reluctant to leave and vowed to rebuild the town. The new site was decided to be renamed to "New Balakot City" and the original town of Balakot to be preserved as "national heritage".

In 2011, it was reported that many residents of Balakot had been rebuilding their homes and businesses in the town, despite a government ban.

A decade after the earthquake, the New Balakot City was still being constructed and many residents still lived in temporary earthquake-resistant shelters. Amid the locals' discontent, the Pakistani government cited the problem of acquiring the land at Bakrayal as a reason for the delay due to a dispute between the national and provincial government as well as the landowners. There are observers who also note that political patronage diverted aid away from those who need it. There are those who started rebuilding their houses in the old city. By 2006, construction of New Balakot City resumed.

2019 bombing by the Indian Air Force 

In the early morning hours of 26 February, Indian warplanes crossed the de facto border in the disputed region of Kashmir, and dropped bombs in the vicinity of Balakot.

Pakistan's military, the first to announce the airstrike on 26 February morning, described the Indian planes as dropping their payload in an uninhabited wooded hilltop area near Balakot.

India, confirming the airstrike later the same day, characterised it to be a preemptive strike directed against a terrorist training camp, and causing the deaths of more than 100 terrorists.
Analysis of open-source satellite imagery by the Atlantic Council's Digital Forensics Laboratory, San Francisco-based Planet Labs, European Space Imaging, and the Australian Strategic Policy Institute, has concluded that India did not hit any targets of significance on the Jaba hilltop site in the vicinity of Balakot.

On 10 April, some international journalists, who were taken to the Jaba hilltop in a tightly controlled trip after 45 days of the strike arranged by Pakistani government, found the largest building of the site to show no evidence of damage.

Ethnicity 
The majority of the population are speakers of Hindko, an Indo-Aryan language closely related to Punjabi, and also spoken in the rest of Mansehra District. There are also speakers of Gujari. The main city area of Balakot is inhibited by Gujjar, Awan, Swati, Madakhail/Madakhel Clan Yousafzai, Syed, Turk, Mughal and Hanki.

Transportation
In 1965, a bridge was built in Balakot over the Kunhar river called the Ayub Bridge. The bridge connects Balakot, as well as the Kaghan valley, with the rest of Pakistan.

See also
Kaghan
Naran

References

External links 
 aerial view
 Hope Floats – A series of documentaries by Pakistani filmmaker Azfar Rizvi
 story re 2005 earthquake in Balakot

2005 Kashmir earthquake
Union councils of Mansehra District
Populated places in Mansehra District
Cities destroyed by earthquakes